Roque Mesa Quevedo (born 7 June 1989) is a Spanish professional footballer who plays as a midfielder for Real Valladolid.

Club career

Early career
Born in Telde, Gran Canaria, Canary Islands, Mesa joined Levante UD's youth system in 2005 after having already made his senior debut with UD Telde. He was promoted to the reserves in the 2007–08 season, in the Tercera División, but left the club in the middle of 2009 and signed for AD Huracán.

On 26 January 2010, Mesa joined CD Tenerife B of the Segunda División B.

Las Palmas
In 2010, Mesa signed with another reserve team, UD Las Palmas Atlético in the fourth level, being promoted to the main squad the following year. On 8 October 2011 he appeared in his first game as a professional, starting in a 2–1 away win against RC Celta de Vigo in the Segunda División.

Mesa finished the campaign with 22 appearances (ten starts, 947 minutes of action) and, on 31 August of the following year, he was loaned to CD Atlético Baleares of the third division. Subsequently, he returned to Las Palmas with its B side, recently promoted to the third tier.

On 28 November 2013, Mesa signed a new four-year deal which ran until 2017, and was definitely promoted to the first team in July of the following year. He scored his first professional goal on 1 November 2014, netting his team's second in a 2–1 home victory over Albacete Balompié.

Mesa appeared in 35 matches and scored four goals during the season, which ended in promotion to La Liga after a 13-year absence. He made his debut in the Spanish top flight on 22 August 2015, in a 1–0 loss at Atlético Madrid.

Mesa scored his first goal in the competition on 23 September 2015, the first in a 2–0 home win against Sevilla FC.

Swansea City
On 6 July 2017, Mesa signed a four-year deal with Premier League team Swansea City for a fee of £11 million. His first game took place on 19 August, when he featured 67 minutes in a 4–0 home loss against Manchester United.

Sevilla
On 30 January 2018, Mesa joined Sevilla on loan for the remainder of the campaign, in a deal that included a buyout clause. In June, the move was made permanent for three years, and he scored two goals in 31 matches during the season as the club finished in sixth place.

On 13 August 2019, Mesa was loaned to CD Leganés also of the Spanish top division. On 5 October of the following year, he terminated his contract with the Andalusians.

Valladolid
Hours after leaving Sevilla, Mesa agreed to a three-year contract at Real Valladolid.

Career statistics

References

External links

1989 births
Living people
People from Telde
Sportspeople from the Province of Las Palmas
Spanish footballers
Footballers from the Canary Islands
Association football midfielders
La Liga players
Segunda División players
Segunda División B players
Tercera División players
Atlético Levante UD players
CD Tenerife B players
UD Las Palmas Atlético players
UD Las Palmas players
CD Atlético Baleares footballers
Sevilla FC players
CD Leganés players
Real Valladolid players
Premier League players
Swansea City A.F.C. players
Spanish expatriate footballers
Expatriate footballers in Wales
Spanish expatriate sportspeople in Wales